Liu Zhiyu (Chinese: 刘治宇; born 5 January 1993) is a Chinese rower.

He won a medal at the 2019 World Rowing Championships.

References

External links

1993 births
Living people
Chinese male rowers
World Rowing Championships medalists for China
Asian Games medalists in rowing
Rowers at the 2014 Asian Games
Asian Games gold medalists for China
Medalists at the 2014 Asian Games
Olympic rowers of China
Rowers at the 2020 Summer Olympics
Medalists at the 2020 Summer Olympics
Olympic medalists in rowing
Olympic bronze medalists for China
20th-century Chinese people
21st-century Chinese people